Fireraisers Forever! is the eighth studio album by British Indie pop band Comet Gain. It was released on 11 October 2019 under Tapete Records.

The first single from the album, "Mid 8Ts" was released on 29 August 2019.

Critical reception
Fireraisers Forever! was met with universal acclaim reviews from critics. At Metacritic, which assigns a weighted average rating out of 100 to reviews from mainstream publications, this release received an average score of 85, based on 4 reviews.

Accolades

Track listing

References

2019 albums
Comet Gain albums
Tapete Records albums